Scuola Italiana Vittorio Montiglio or Scuola Italiana Santiago is an Italian international school founded in 1891. Located at Las Condes, Santiago Province, Chile. It has scuola infanzia (preschool) through scuola secondaria di II grado (upper secondary school).

The current campus has 52 classrooms, two tennis courts, three soccer (football) fields, two swimming pools, two bocce fields, and four multipurpose fields. It opened on 24 March 2009."

References

External links
  Scuola Italiana Vittorio Montiglio 

International schools in Santiago, Chile
Italian international schools in Chile